Glen's long-fingered bat (Miniopterus gleni) is a species of vesper bat in the family Miniopteridae found only in Madagascar.

References

Miniopteridae
Bats of Africa
Mammals described in 1995
Taxonomy articles created by Polbot